Tiffany Darunee Sornpao (born 22 May 1998), is an American-born Thai footballer who plays as a goalkeeper for Selfoss and the Thailand women's national team.

Early life
Sornpao was raised in Berkeley Lake, Georgia.

References

1998 births
Living people
American people of Danish descent
American sportspeople of Thai descent
Tiffany Sornpao
People from Duluth, Georgia
People from Gwinnett County, Georgia
Sportspeople from the Atlanta metropolitan area
Soccer players from Georgia (U.S. state)
Tiffany Sornpao
American women's soccer players
Women's association football goalkeepers
Kennesaw State Owls women's soccer players
Tiffany Sornpao
2019 FIFA Women's World Cup players